Arignar Anna Government Arts College, Attur, is a general degree college located in Attur, Tamil Nadu. It was established in the year 1972. The college is affiliated with Periyar University. This college offers different courses in arts, commerce and science.

Departments

Science
Physics
Chemistry
Mathematics
Botany
Computer Science

Arts and Commerce
Tamil
English
History
Economics
Business Administration
Commerce

Accreditation
The college is  recognized by the University Grants Commission (UGC).

References

External links

Educational institutions established in 1972
1972 establishments in Tamil Nadu
Colleges affiliated to Periyar University